The years 1980–1989 in birding and ornithology.

Worldwide

New species
Bird species new to science described in the 1980s

Taxonomic developments

Ornithologists

Deaths
1985
 22 February - David Hunt (born 1934) – ″The Scilly Birdman″
1987
 11 September - Sir Charles Alexander Fleming died at age 71 (born 9 September 1916).

World listing

Europe

Britain

Breeding birds
1981
 Cranes bred in Britain (Norfolk Broads) for the first time in over 400 years

Migrant and wintering birds

Rare birds
1981
 Europe's first magnolia warbler on St Agnes, Isles of Scilly.
1982
Britains first northern harrier on the Isles of Scilly from 22 October 1982 until 8 June 1983
1983
Britain's first white-throated robin in June 1983 at the Calf of Man Bird Observatory.
1984
Britain's second common yellowthroat found on 7 June 1984 at Fetlar, Shetland.
Britain's third common yellowthroat found on 2 October 1984 at Bryher.
Britain's second hermit thrush found on 28 October 1984 at Peninnis Head, St Mary's.
1985
Europe's first Wilson's warbler found on 13 October at Rame Head, Cornwall.
Britain's third calandra lark found on St Mary's, Isles of Scilly (first record for the islands) on 26 April and stayed until 29 April.
1988
 Britain's first accepted record of a brown-headed cowbird at Islay, Argyll on 24 April
 Britain's first accepted record of a double-crested cormorant at Cleveland from December 1988 to late April 1989.
1990
 Western Palearctic's first tree swallow at Porth Hellick, St Mary's, Isles of Scilly from 6 to 11 June
 Britain's second white-throated robin on 27 May 1990 at Skokholm, Pembrokeshire.

Ireland

Portugal

Rare birds
1984
 Eight great blue herons reached the Azores in April and a ninth in June. These birds are not considered to be the first for Europe. (See France, 1996).

Scandinavia

North America

Asia

References

Bird
Birding and ornithology by year